Mozhgan, also spelled Mojgan Mezhgan
() Mozhgān  and Mozhan is a Persian given name for girls. Mozhgan is the plural form of Mozha  , meaning "eyelash".

Persian feminine given names